Nenghai (20 January 1886 – 1 January 1967) was a Vajrayana Buddhist monk of the Gelug school and religious leader in modern China. He is considered one of the key figures of the "Movement of Tantric Rebirth" which sought to revitalize Chinese Esoteric Buddhism.

Nenghai was vice-president of the Buddhist Association of China. He was a member of the National Committee of the Chinese People's Political Consultative Conference and a delegate to the 1st and 2nd National People's Congress.

Biography

Early years
Nenghai was born Gong Xueguang in Hanwang Town of Mianzhu city, in Sichuan province, to Gong Changyi, a peddler. He had an elder sister. When he was a child, both his parents died, leaving only him and his 10-year-old sister. By age 14, he became an apprentice in Hengshengtong, and studied Classic and history under the proprietor. In 1905, he enrolled at the Army Academy (now Army War College), where he studied alongside Liu Xiang and Liu Wenhui. After graduating in 1907 he became a drillmaster at Yunnan Military Academy, both Zhu De and Yang Sen were his student. Then he served as regimental commander in Sichuan government, holding the position until he was transferred to the Beijing General's Office.

In 1910, Nenghai went to Japan on a political and industrial investigation. The expedition to Japan gave him exposure to Buddhism. After half year, Nenghai returned to China and studied Buddhism under Zhang Kecheng at Peking University. In 1917, Nenghai moved to Chengdu, capital of Sichuan province, founded the Shaocheng Society of Buddhist Studies.

In 1924, he went to Tianbao Temple, the Buddhist monastery where she received the tonsure ceremony under abbot Fo Yuan, as the 44th lineage of Linji school, and received complete ordination under abbot Shi Guanyi, in Baoguang Temple.

Tibetan Vajrayana
His encounters with Tibetan Buddhist texts and lamas in China led him to visit Tibet several times, initially staying in Kham (1926–1927) and then to Lhasa between 1928–1932 and 1940–1941. He became the main Chinese disciple of Khangsar Rinpoché (1890–1941) at Drepung monastery and was initiated into the tantric deities of Yellow Mañjuśrī and Yamāntaka-Vajrabhairava. After his initial stay in Lhasa he moved to Mount Wutai (1934–1937), a traditional home of Chinese Vajrayana, and began teaching Buddhism to a Chinese audience. He spent his time teaching, translating and writing. In 1937, he founded the tantric Jinci Temple in the suburb of Chengdu.

Nenghai and a group of disciples from Jinci traveled to Tibet again in 1940–1941, where he received further transmission from Khangsar Rinpoché. During the following years he founded five more monasteries in the Gelugpa tradition and translated many Tibetan works into Chinese.

Works and teachings
Nenghai's works and teachings which include Tibetan and traditional Chinese Buddhist doctrines reflect his desire to infuse Chinese Buddhism with the teachings of the Tibetan tradition. His students considered that his teachings "joined purely in one doctrine Tibetan and Chinese teachings."

His works can be divided into esoteric and exoteric. His exoteric works strongly emphasized ethical discipline (sila) as the foundation for the path, following the Gelug tradition's lamrim teachings. They discuss scriptures important in Tibetan Buddhism like the Abhisamayalamkara and those important in Chinese Buddhism like the Avatamsaka Sutra. Most of his literary production though consists of translations of Tibetan tantric works.

Public activities and death
After the establishment of the Communist State, he lived in Guangji Temple , in Beijing. In October 1951, he attended the Chinese People's Political Consultative Conference as a specially invited delegate. He was a member of the Permanent Committee and vice-president of the Chinese Buddhist Association from 1953 to 1966. He also  joined a Chinese delegation in Delhi for the Conference of Asian Nations.

In the summer of 1966, Mao Zedong launched the Cultural Revolution, Nenghai lived in Shancaidong Temple, he was labeled as a gangster and suffered political persecution, he and his disciples were mistreated and tortured. On January 1, 1967, Nenghai died in Shancaidong Temple, aged 81.

His relics are preserved on Mount Wutai in a stupa that was built in 1981 in the Tibeto-Chinese style.

References

1886 births
1967 deaths
Rinzai Buddhists
Tibetan Buddhist monks
Tibetan Buddhists from China
20th-century Buddhist monks